We Rock Hard is the first album by the English electronic group Freestylers and their most commercially successful release to date. AllMusic describes the album as a run through of the band members' back catalogue, but it still showcases the classic big beat and breakbeat electronica that would remain the band's trademark sound along with ragga and dub twists.

The album features the single "Ruffneck", which garnered a certain level of MTV rotation and has a style that's reminiscent of a reggae Beastie Boys and remains popular with Amazon reviewers.

The track "Freestyle Noize" was featured in the PlayStation skateboarding video game Thrasher: Skate and Destroy.

Track listing

The female vocals on track 4 "Don't Stop" are sampled from the 1976 song "I Know" by Candi Staton.
The 1999 US release omits the tracks "The Darkside", "Breaker Beats (Part 2)", "Scratch 22 (Jay-Rock's Theme)" and "Hold Up Your Hands" and includes "Spaced Invader" and "Check the Skillz" (from the B-sides of the singles "Ruffneck" and "B-Boy Stance", respectively).

References

External links
 We Rock Hard (1998) at Discogs
 We Rock Hard (1999) at Discogs

1998 debut albums
Freestylers albums